The Battle of Trancoso was fought on 29 May 1385 between the Kingdom of Portugal and the Crown of Castile.

Following the coronation of João of Aviz, John I of Castile sent an army into the Portuguese region of Beira in retaliation for Portuguese defiance, where they committed all the kinds of atrocities. The city of Viseu was pillaged and burned, but when the Castilians were returning to Castile with their plundered loot and the prisoners they had taken, a Portuguese army met them, dismounted and assumed a defensive formation. The Castilians exhausted themselves in attack but ended up being utterly routed, with very high casualties among their ranks, and with six of their seven captains killed. The Portuguese released all those taken captive by the Castilians and recovered all the pillage taken from their towns.

See also
History of Portugal
House of Avis
Nuno Álvares Pereira
Hundred Years War

References
Jean Froissart, Sainte-Palaye (Jean-Baptiste de La Curne, M. de La Curne de), Chronicles of England, France, Spain, and the adjoining countries,: from the latter part of the reign of Edward II. to the coronation of Henry IV. (1839)
João Gouveia Monteiro, Aljubarrota-1385-A Batalha Real (2003) 
Pereira Felix, Abridgement of the History of Portugal (2009)
H. V. Livermore, A new History of Portugal (1966)
H. Morse Stephens, Portugal A History (1891)

Notes

Trancoso
Trancoso
1385 in Europe
Trancoso
Trancoso